Bloemhof is a neighborhood in Rotterdam, Netherlands.

In 2009 Eberhard van der Laan, the Minister of Housing, referred to the neighborhood as the fourth worst in his "40 problem neighbourhoods" list.

References

Neighbourhoods of Rotterdam